Brownleeinae is an orchid subtribe in the tribe Orchideae.

References

External links

Orchideae
Orchid subtribes